The UAAP Season 78 seniors division football tournament started on February 7, 2016, following the shift in the start of the league. The tournament opened at Emperador McKinley Hill Stadium in Fort Bonifacio, Taguig City. Other games were held at the Moro Lorenzo Football Field of Ateneo de Manila University in Katipunan Ave., Loyola Heights, Quezon City. Ateneo was the tournament host.

The men's and women's Final matches happened on May 5, 2016, which is exactly eight months after the start of the Season last September 5, 2015. The championship games also served as the last ones for the Season, making football the final event.

Men's tournament

Elimination round

Team standings

Match-up results

Playoffs

Bracket

Semifinals

Finals

Awards

Most Valuable Player: Daniel Gadia (University of the Philippines)
Rookie of the Year: Darius Diamante (De La Salle University)
Best Striker: Paolo Salenga (National University), Jarvey Gayoso (Ateneo de Manila University)
Best Midfielder: Paolo Bugas (Far Eastern University)
Best Defender: Chy Villaseñor (Far Eastern University)
Best Goalkeeper: Rafael de Guzman (De La Salle University)
Fair Play Award: Ateneo de Manila University

Statistics 
Double Round Robin Statistics

Goal scorers 
11 goals

8 goals

7 goals

6 goals

4 goals

3 goals

2 goals

1 goal

own goal

Scoring

Overall 
Total number of goals scored: 156
Average goals per match: 2.79
Total number of braces: 19
Most number of Braces: 3
Val Jurao
Jarvey Gayoso
Total number of hat-tricks: 3
Most number of hat-tricks: 1
Gregory Norman Yang
Paolo Salenga4
Mashu Yoshioka
Own goals scored: 1
Jackson Ramos

Timing 
First goal of the tournament: 
Gregory Norman Yang for De La Salle Green Archers against Ateneo Blue Eagles
First brace of the tournament:
Nico Macapal for National University Bulldogs against University of the East Red Warriors
First hat-trick of the tournament: 
Gregory Norman Yang for De La Salle Green Archers against Adamson Falcons
Fastest goal in a match from kickoff: 3rd minute
Jeremiah Borlongan for UP Fighting Maroons against UST Growling Tigers
Fastest brace of the tournament:  28th minute
Darwin Busimon for UST Growling Tigers against UP Fighting Maroons
Fastest hat-trick of the tournament: 64th minute
Paolo Salenga for National University Bulldogs against Adamson Falcons

Teams 
Most goals scored by a team: 32
Ateneo Blue Eagles
Fewest goals scored by a team: 3
Adamson Falcons
Most goals conceded by a team: 42
Adamson Falcons
Fewest goals conceded by a team: 5
UP Fighting Maroons
Best goal difference: +18
FEU Tamaraws
Worst goal difference: -39
Adamson Falcons
Most goals scored in a match by both teams: 7
FEU Tamaraws 5–2 Ateneo Blue Eagles
NU Bulldogs 7–0 Adamson Falcons
Ateneo Blue Eagles 7–0 Adamson Falcons
Most goals scored in a match by one team: 7
NU Bulldogs
Ateneo Blue Eagles
Most goals scored in a match by the losing team: 2
Ateneo Blue Eagles
UST Growling Tigers
National University Bulldogs
Biggest margin of victory: 7
NU Bulldogs
Ateneo Blue Eagles
Most clean sheets achieved by a team: 11
UP Fighting Maroons
Fewest clean sheets achieved by a team: 2
UE Red Warriors
Adamson Falcons
Most consecutive clean sheets achieved by a team: 6
FEU Tamaraws
UP Fighting Maroons
Longest winning run: 6
FEU Tamaraws
UP Fighting Maroons
Longest unbeaten run: 8
UST Growling Tigers
Longest winless run: 14
UE Red Warriors

Women's tournament

Elimination round

Team standing

Match-up results

Playoffs

Finals

Awards

Most Valuable Player: Monica Louise Manalansana (University of the Philippines)
Rookie of the Year: Sara Castañeda (De La Salle University)
Best Striker: Sara Castañeda (De La Salle University) & Shannon Arthur (De La Salle University)
Best Midfielder: Sara Castañeda (De La Salle University)
Best Defender: Regine Metillo (De La Salle University)
Best Goalkeeper: Inna Palacios (De La Salle University)
Fair Play Award: University of Santo Tomas

Statistics

Goal scorers 
As of April 16, 2016
6 goals

5 goals

4 goals

3 goals

2 goals

1 goal

own goal

Scoring 
As of April 7, 2016

Overall 
Total number of goals scored: 57
Average goals per match: 3.8
Total number of braces: 6
Most number of Braces: 2
Shannon Arthur
Total number of hat-tricks: 1
Most number of hat-tricks: 1
Kali Navea-Huff
Own goals scored: 1
Nina Catedrilia

Timing 
First goal of the tournament: 
Kyla Inquig for De La Salle Green Archers against Ateneo Blue Eagles
First brace of the tournament:
Cam Rodriguez for Ateneo Blue Eagles against De La Salle Green Archers
First hat-trick of the tournament: 
Kali Navea-Huff for UP Fighting Maroons against UST Growling Tigers
Fastest goal in a match from kickoff: 8th minute
Sara Castaneda for De La Salle Green Archers against UST Growling Tigers
Fastest brace of the tournament:  35th minute
Jovelle Sudaria for FEU Tamaraws against UP Fighting Maroons
Fastest hat-trick of the tournament: 68th minute
Kali Navea-Huff for UP Fighting Maroons against UST Growling Tigers

Teams 
Most goals scored by a team: 20
De La Salle Green Archers
Fewest goals scored by a team: 7
FEU Tamaraws
Most goals conceded by a team: 18
UST Growling Tigers
Fewest goals conceded by a team: 6
De La Salle Green Archers
Best goal difference: +14
De La Salle Green Archers
Worst goal difference: -10
UST Growling Tigers
Most goals scored in a match by both teams: 8
UP Fighting Maroons 5–3 UST Growling Tigers
Most goals scored in a match by one team: 6
De La Salle Green Archers
Most goals scored in a match by the losing team: 3
UST Growling Tigers
Biggest margin of victory: 6
De La Salle Green Archers
Most clean sheets achieved by a team: 3
De La Salle Green Archers
Fewest clean sheets achieved by a team: 0
UST Growling Tigers
Most consecutive clean sheets achieved by a team: 3
De La Salle Green Archers
Longest winning run: 5
De La Salle Green Archers
Longest unbeaten run: 7
De La Salle Green Archers
Longest winless run: 3
FEU Tamaraws
UST Growling Tigers

Juniors' tournament

Elimination round

Team standing

Match-up results

Scores
Results to the right and top of the gray cells are first round games, those to the left and below are second round games.

Playoffs

Final

Awards

Most Valuable Player: Kieth Absalon (Far Eastern University)
Rookie of the Year: Roberto Ripoll (Far Eastern University)
Best Striker: Chester Gio Pabualan (Far Eastern University)
Best Midfielder: Chester Gio Pabualan (Far Eastern University)
Best Defender: Roberto Ripoll (Far Eastern University)
Best Goalkeeper: Gavin Rosario (Ateneo de Manila University)
Fair Play Award: De La Salle-Zobel

Overall championship points

Seniors' division

Juniors' division

See also
 UAAP Season 77

78
2016 in Philippine football
2016 in Philippine sport